Yao Yuncong (born 19 June 1995) is a Chinese sport shooter.

He participated at the 2018 ISSF World Shooting Championships, winning a medal.

References

External links

Living people
1995 births
Chinese male sport shooters
ISSF rifle shooters
Sport shooters from Sichuan
21st-century Chinese people